Templeton is an unincorporated community in Bolivar Township, Benton County, in the U.S. state of Indiana. It is part of the Lafayette, Indiana Metropolitan Statistical Area.

History
Templeton was laid out by Col. William J. Templeton and his wife Melissa on December 23, 1873, and contained 225 lots. Two railways, the Cleveland, Cincinnati, Chicago and St. Louis (the "Big Four") and the Lafayette, Muncie and Bloomington (the "Nickel Plate"), intersected at the site. Its first building was a shanty occupied by John Cosgrove, and was soon followed by the dwellings of Col. Templeton and others. The town gained it first grain elevator in 1874 and a tile factory in 1881 which operated two large, steam-powered kilns. By 1883 the town's businesses included David Lanham & Co. and Finch & Son (both purveyors of dry goods and groceries), Joseph Dehart's notions and butcher shop, John Rosa's grocery, Dr. C. W. Fall (physician and pharmacist), Jasper Bristow (physician) and the Railroad House.
Templeton's population numbered around 150 in the 1920s, at which time it also had a grain elevator, grade school and three or four stores.

A post office was established at Templeton in 1873, and remained in operation until it was discontinued in 1931.

Geography
It is surrounded by open farmland, with Big Pine Creek less than a mile to the southeast. U.S. Route 52 passes along the town's northeast side, and the Kankakee, Beaverville and Southern Railroad, which comes in from the east, splits into two lines that head west and northwest.

Demographics

References

External links

Unincorporated communities in Benton County, Indiana
Lafayette metropolitan area, Indiana
Unincorporated communities in Indiana
1873 establishments in Indiana
Populated places established in 1873